Ada Haug Grythe (26 August 1934 – 14 August 2014) was a Norwegian journalist. She was born in Stange, and was married to Odd Grythe.

She was assigned to the NRK from 1961, and headed the television department for children and young adults from 1980 to 1991.

References

1934 births
2014 deaths
Norwegian journalists
People from Stange
NRK people